Zanobi da Strada (1312 – 1361 in Avignon), was an Italian translator, scholar and correspondent of Petrarch and a friend of Giovanni Boccaccio.

He was born in Strata or Strada in Chianti, a hamlet or neighborhood within the town  of Greve in Chianti, near Florence, Tuscany. He initially worked in Florence as a secretary for the King of Naples. He was responsible for some manuscript rediscoveries in the Monte Cassino monastery library to which he had access as secretary to the diocesan bishop and where he lived from 1355 to 1357. Early Apuleius MS marginalia (incl. mysterious spurcum additamentum at Met. 10.21.1) is in his hand.

Zanobi da Strada was crowned poet laureate by Charles IV on May 15, 1355 at Pisa to the great disgust of Boccaccio who declined to recognise the degree as legitimate. From there, Zanobi worked as an apostolic protonotary and secretary to pope Innocent VI. Zanobi would die in Avignon. Few of his verses survive. He was also a translator of some classic works, including the Morals by St. Gregory.

Notes

References
Scribes and Scholars, L.D. Reynolds and N.G. Wilson, OUP 1968, p. 110

1312 births
1361 deaths
People from Greve in Chianti
Italian translators
Petrarch
14th-century Italian writers